Rip Rig and Panic may refer to:
Rip, Rig and Panic (album), a 1965 jazz album by saxophonist Roland Kirk
Rip Rig + Panic,  a post-punk band from Bristol, England